Ahmad Dhani Prasetyo (born Dhani Ahmad Prasetyo; 26 May 1972), better known as Ahmad Dhani, Dhani Muhammad Prasetyo or Dhani S. Manaf, is an Indonesian musician. He was the frontman of Dewa 19 with his colleague Once Mekel as the co-lead singer, and Ahmad Band, and also a member of the inter-continental band The Rock. He is the owner and chairman of Republik Cinta Management.

Dhani has worked as a promoter and songwriter for other artists, including Alexa Key and Mulan Jameela. He has won numerous awards including the Indonesian Music Awards for best musical arrangement. He is one of the most influential musicians in Southeast Asia. In recent years, he has generated controversy after his son killed seven people while driving illegally, and after becoming involved in politics. In January 2019, he was sentenced to 18 months in jail for hate speech. In June 2019, he was sentenced to an additional year in jail for insulting political rivals. He was released in December 2019.

Early life
Dhani Ahmad Prasetyo was born in 1972 in Surabaya, East Java, as the first of three children of Eddy Abdul Manaf, a diplomat of Sundanese origin from Garut, West Java, and Joyce Theresia Pamela Kohler, an Indonesian of German descent. In 2020, Dhani denied reports that his maternal grandfather, Jan Pieter Friederich Kohler, a German born in the then-Dutch-occupied country in 1883, was an Ashkenazi Jew. Dhani said his mother and grandfather were German Catholics.

Dhani's stepbrother, Dadang S. Manaf, is a well-known Indonesian musician and was a strong influence on Dhani's musical interest from his childhood. Dhani's father bought him a keyboard when he was young and enrolled him for music lessons, hoping Dhani would excel in classical music. Dhani was largely influenced by the British rock band Queen.

Career

Dewa 19
Dhani formed his first musical group, Dewa, in 1986 with Andra Junaidi, Erwin Prasetya, and Henry Juniarso. Dhani served as the group's vocalist and keyboardist. He skipped school to jam with his friends at Juniarso's house in the Airlangga University complex.

While in Dewa, Dhani became interested in jazz, and Dewa changed its name to Down Beat. Down Beat won the Youth Jazz Festival in East Java. It also won the inaugural Festival 90, a high school band competition that was part of the Djarum Super Fiesta Musical. The band, however, resumed playing rock, renaming itself "Dewa 19", with a new vocalist, Ari Lasso.

The lack of modern recording studios in Surabaya prompted Dhani to move to Jakarta in 1989 in search of a record deal for Dewa 19. After being rejected by several labels, Dewa 19 was signed to Team Records by Jan Djuhana. Their first album, Dewa 19 (1992), was a huge success with a number of hits such as Kangen and Kita Tidak Sedang Bercinta Lagi. It was the best-selling Indonesian rock album of 1993 and won Best Newcomer at the Indonesian Music Awards.

Dhani helped to produce the band's 11 albums, which included Dewa 19 (1992), Format Masa Depan (1994), Terbaik Terbaik (1995), Pandawa Lima (1997), The Best of Dewa 19 (1999), Bintang Lima (2000), Cintailah Cinta (2002), Atas Nama Cinta I & II (2004), Laskar Cinta (2004), Republik Cinta (2006), and Kerajaan Cinta (2007). Dewa 19 went through several personnel changes but remained one of the largest forces in the Indonesian music scene, with Dhani as its driving force, until breaking up in 2011.

Dhani's popular solo album Laskar Cinta (Warriors of Love) was praised because it "challenged militant ideology".

Solo projects
After Dewa disbanded, Dhani joined forces with the Australian heavy metal band, Hospital The Musical to form a band named the Rock. The band's first album, Master Mister Ahmad Dhani I, sold more than 150,000 copies in Indonesia. It contained three new songs and seven covers of Dhani's earlier songs. The hits from the album were "Kamu Kamulah Surgaku" and "Munajat Cinta".

Dhani next appeared in a band named TRIAD, an acronym for the Rock Indonesia Ahmad Dhani. Unlike the Rock, TRIAD has five to six members unofficially appearing onstage and even sometimes four members, with Dhani performing as lead singer and rhythm guitarist. Triad's self-titled album sold 500,000 copies.  It contained four new tracks, "Selir Hati", "Benar Salah IDolaku", "Mama", and "Sedang Mikirin Kamu", and seven cover tracks, including Queen's "Mustapha".

In 2010, Dhani sang with Ari Lasso at concerts in Jakarta and Bali, leading to rumors of a Dewa 19 reunion. In Bali, Dhani announced he would form a band with Judika, the winner of Indonesian Idol 2007. A few months later, Dhani declared the new band would be named Mahadewa, which would substitute for Dewa 19, which he said still existed but in a vacuum. He dismissed rumors that Dewa 19 was finished. "I will focus on Mahadewa, my new band, and Dewa 19 still exists", he said. In January 2012, Mahadewa announced that its debut album would soon be released, containing five new songs and five covers of Dewa 19 songs. The album's first single, "Cinta Itu Buta", was released in mid-2012. The complete album's release was stalled because Dhani was preoccupied with his role as a judge on Indonesian Idol and X Factor Indonesia. However, he still found time for some reunion shows with former members of Dewa 19 in several big cities in Indonesia. Mahadewa's long-awaited debut album, Past to Present, was released in 2013. He also released his first song in Javanese, Aja Kuwi (Don't Choose Him) a few weeks before the 2014 presidential election.

Personal life
Although Dhani was born in Surabaya, he is actually a Sundanese and has Sumedang and Garut ancestry. Dhani married Maia Estianty in 1996, after a long relationship when Maia was still in high school in Surabaya. They have three children named after prominent Sufi leaders whom Dhani admires, namely Ahmad Al Ghazali, Ahmad Jalaluddin "El" Rumi, and Abdul Qodir Jaelani. They formed a rock band named "The Lucky Laki" in 2009, although each also have their own solo works. In late 2006, Dhani and Maia made mutual allegations of infidelity, resulting in Maia filing for divorce. Their marriage was annulled on 23 September 2008 by South Jakarta Religious Court.

Dhani has been described, as one of the richest performers in Indonesia.

In August 2013, Dhani admitted he had fathered a daughter, Safeea Ahmad, with singer Mulan Jameela.

Controversy

Child's car crash
On 8 September 2013, Dhani's thirteen-year-old son Abdul Qodir Jaelani was illegally driving a Mitsubishi Lancer at 176 km/h and crashed into a Daihatsu Gran Max minivan carrying 13 people on a Jakarta toll road. Seven people were killed and Abdul himself was injured. Police refused to charge Dhani over the accident for allowing his child to drive a car. State prosecutors in June 2014 recommended Abdul be sentenced to two years probation.

Politics
On 21 May 2014, Dhani announced his support for ex-general Prabowo Subianto's campaign for the July 9 presidential election. Dhani claimed, "Almost every masculine man (lelaki jantan) votes for Prabowo. If a man doesn't vote for Prabowo, his masculinity (kejantanan) must be questioned."

In June 2014, Dhani released a video clip in support of Prabowo and his running mate Hatta Rajasa. The clip featured Dhani and three Indonesian Idol contestants – Husein, Nowela and Virzha – performing a parody of Queen's "We Will Rock You", and included the lyrics "who will awaken Indonesia from its misery if not us? Prabowo-Hatta!" The video was widely condemned because Dhani used the music without permission from Queen and he wore a replica of the jacket worn by Nazi Germany's SS and Gestapo chief Heinrich Himmler, who oversaw the genocide of six million Jews. Dhani was criticized for dancing in the clip with a golden Garuda – the mythical bird that is Indonesia's emblem. Time magazine's website ran a critical article headlined "This Indonesian Nazi Video Is One of the Worst Pieces of Political Campaigning Ever". Prabowo thanked Dhani, saying, "This video is boosting our fighting spirit!" However, there were rumors that Dhani was struck by Prabowo for his controversial music video, during a visit to the presidential candidate's residence.

On 23 June 2014, a Twitter post allegedly by Dhani stated that he would cut off his penis if presidential contender Joko Widodo and his running mate, former vice president Jusuf Kalla won the election. Dhani later claimed he never made the tweet and filed complaints against online media outlets that carried news of the controversial tweet.

Heroin use
In September 2016, after undergoing a drug test while running for office as the deputy regent of Bekasi, Dhani said he had used drugs, including heroin, in the 1990s because, he claimed, Indonesia at that time did not have a law prohibiting drugs. Indonesia's 1976 Narcotics Law prohibited the production, trafficking, storage and personal use of narcotics without permission from the Health Minister. Indonesia subsequently issued a revised anti-narcotics law in 1997.

2016 treason allegation
On 2 December 2016, Dhani was arrested at a Jakarta hotel on suspicion of involvement in an alleged plot to overthrow the government. He was released a day later but remained a suspect over alleged defamation of the president.

Hate speech convictions
Ahmad Dhani on 5 March 2017 posted on Twitter: "Siapa saja yg dukung Penista Agama adalah Bajingan yg perlu di ludahi muka nya" (English: "whoever supports the blasphemer is a bastard who needs to be spat in the face"). The tweet was a reference to supporters of Jakarta Governor Basuki Tjahaja 'Ahok' Purnama, who was standing for re-election while on trial for insulting Islam. In November 2017, South Jakarta Police declared Dhani a suspect for hate speech. Dhani said he has never felt guilty. "In the examination I admitted that I hate those who defend religious blasphemers, I hate those who blaspheme religion, I also hate corruptors, rapists and drug dealers" he said. His trial commenced in April 2018 at South Jakarta District Court. On 28 January 2019, he was found guilty of hate speech and sentenced to one year and six months in jail. Prosecutors had recommended a two-year jail sentence. After the conclusion of his trial, he was sent to Jakarta's Cipinang jail. His lawyer Hendarsam Marantoko said he would appeal the verdict, which he described as an act of revenge for the jailing of Ahok.

In a separate case, Surabaya District Court in East Java province on 11 June 2019 sentenced Dhani to one year in jail for referring to his political rivals as "idiots" in an online post. The court ruled he had violated Article 27, Clause 3, of the Information and Electronic Transactions Law. The one-year sentence was reduced to three months and a six-month suspended sentence on appeal. Dhani was released from Cipinang jail on 30 December 2019. His colleague Lieus Sungkharisma said Dhani's release was thanks to Prabowo Subianto, who was appointed defense minister while Dhani was jailed. Dhani said he would continue to support Prabowo's presidential aspirations.

LGBT views
Ahmad Dhani once gave a statement that he supports LGBT and will legalize same-sex marriage if he is elected president. However, after he became affiliated with PKS, a right-wing party, he changed his statement. He even forbade his son to study in London for fear of homosexuality. He equated LGBT with rape, saying that LGBT people would drug his son and rape him.

References

External links

 Official website (archived)
 Republic Cinta Management
 Ahmad Dhani Meets with Children at Rumah Belajar, US Department of State
 Eddy Abdul Manaf Interview

1972 births
21st-century Indonesian male singers
People from Garut
People from Sumedang
People from Surabaya
Indonesian people of German descent
Indonesian people of German-Jewish descent
Indonesian people of Jewish descent
Indonesian Muslims
Indonesian pop singers
Indonesian rock singers
Indonesian songwriters
Anugerah Musik Indonesia winners
Living people
Dewa 19 members
Sundanese people
Indo people
20th-century Muslims
21st-century Muslims
21st-century criminals
20th-century Indonesian male singers